The Flaming Clue is a 1920 American silent drama film directed by Edwin L. Hollywood and written by William B. Courtney and Frederic Van Rensselaer Dey.  The film stars Harry T. Morey, Lucy Fox, and Sidney Dalbrook.

Cast list

References

1920 films
American silent feature films
American black-and-white films
1920 drama films
Vitagraph Studios films
Films directed by Edwin L. Hollywood
1920s English-language films
1920s American films